TCCC may refer to:

 Taichung City Council, a city council in Taiwan
 The Coca-Cola Company, a Fortune 500 company
 The Commonwealth Coast Conference, an NCAA Division III-affiliated athletic conference in eastern New England
 The Tarawa Climate Change Conference, an international diplomatic conference held in Kiribati in November 2010
 The Technical Committee on Computer Communications, a Technical Committee that is part of the IEEE Communications Society that sponsors research efforts and standardization in computer communications.
 The Technical Committee on Computer Communications, a Technical Committee that is part of the IEEE Computer Society that sponsors research efforts and standardization in computer communications.
 Tactical Combat Casualty Care, a standard of care in prehospital battlefield medicine. 
The Cross Christian Centre, a church in Nigeria with a mandates to reconcile men both unto God in one body  Eph 2:16.